The Palawan drongo (Dicrurus palawanensis) is an Asian bird of the family Dicruridae. It was formerly considered conspecific with the hair-crested drongo.

It is endemic to Palawan.

References

 

Palawan drongo
Birds of Palawan
Endemic birds of the Philippines
Palawan drongo
Palawan drongo